Todor Angelov Dzekov (rendered in French as Théodore Angheloff; 12 January 1900 – 30 November 1943) was a Bulgarian anarcho-communist activist who lived in exile in Belgium for much of his adult life. He served in the Bulgarian Dimitrov Battalion during the Spanish Civil War and, during the German occupation of Belgium, was a leader within the Partisans Armés as part of the Belgian Resistance. He was captured and executed in 1943.

In Belgium, Angelov was an active supporter of the Communist Party of Belgium. In 1942, he organized a resistance group, the "Corps Mobile de Bruxelles", under the auspices of the "Partisans Armés" and associated with the "Front de l'Indépendance", the major Belgian underground movement.

References

External links
  Otages de la terreur nazie: le Bulgare Angheloff et son groupe de Partisans juifs, Bruxelles, 1940–1943, Google Books preview

1900 births
1943 deaths
Belgian communists
Belgian Marxists
Belgian people of Bulgarian descent
Bulgarian communists
Macedonian Bulgarians
Belgian resistance members
Bulgarian people executed in Nazi concentration camps
People from Kyustendil
Bulgarian people of the Spanish Civil War
Resistance members who died in Nazi concentration camps
International Brigades personnel
People who died in Breendonk prison camp
Resistance members killed by Nazi Germany
Executed Belgian people
Belgian people executed in Nazi concentration camps
Bulgarian anarchists
Executed communists